Vanguard Visionaries is the title of a recording by American folk music and country blues artist Doc Watson, released in 2007.

History
Vanguard Records had a high profile during the 1960s folk revival and released music by many folk artists such as Watson, Odetta,  John Fahey and many others. To celebrate their 60th anniversary, Vanguard has released a series of artist samplers called Vanguard Visionaries from the 1960s and early-'70s era. It contains a small track listing and all the tracks are available on other compilation packages.

Reception

Writing for Allmusic, music critic Steve Leggett wrote of the album "A true American treasure, Watson recorded some ten albums for Vanguard in the 1960s beginning in 1964, each full of his rich, everyman singing and startling guitar and banjo skills. This brief sampler is representative of Watson's work with the label..."

Track listing
All songs Traditional unless otherwise noted.
 "Country Blues" – 3:30
 "Rising Sun Blues" – 4:16
 "Little Sadie" – 1:59
 "Muskrat" – 2:52
 "Dill Pickle Rag" – 1:24
 "Beaumont Rag" – 1:42
 "Shady Grove" – 2:57
 "Black Mountain Rag" – 1:32
 "Tennessee Stud" (Jimmie Driftwood) – 3:37
 "Windy and Warm" (John D. Loudermilk) – 2:12

Personnel
Doc Watson – vocals, guitar, banjo, harmonica

References

2007 compilation albums
Doc Watson compilation albums
Vanguard Records compilation albums